Pereiaslav-Khmelnytskyi Raion was a raion (district) in Kyiv Oblast of Ukraine. Its administrative center, Pereiaslav (from 1943 until 2019 the city was named Pereiaslav-Khmelnytskyi), was incorporated separately as a town of oblast significance and did not belong to the raion. The raion was abolished on 18 July 2020 as part of the administrative reform of Ukraine, which reduced the number of raions of Kyiv Oblast to seven. The area of Pereiaslav-Khmelnytskyi Raion was merged into Boryspil Raion.

At the time of disestablishment, the raion consisted of four hromadas, 
 Divychky rural hromada with the administration in the selo of Divychky;
 Studenyky rural hromada with the administration in the selo of Studenyky;
 Tashan rural hromada with the administration in the selo of Tashan;
 Tsybli rural hromada with the administration in the selo of Tsybli.

References

External links

Інформація із сервера Верховної Ради
Переяслав-Хмельницький район — економіка району, органи влади, підприємства, селищні ради

Former raions of Kyiv Oblast
1932 establishments in Ukraine
Ukrainian raions abolished during the 2020 administrative reform